Timothy Thomas McTyer (born December 14, 1975) is the head American football coach at Adelanto High School in California and a former cornerback in the National Football League. He played two seasons for the Philadelphia Eagles and one for the Cleveland Browns.  He played college football at Brigham Young University. He was hired as head football coach of Banning High School in February 2010 after coaching at local high schools and Los Angeles Southwest College. McTyer is the father of NFL cornerback Torry McTyer.

References

External links
Stats from databaseFootball.com

1975 births
Living people
American football safeties
Players of American football from Los Angeles
Cleveland Browns players
Philadelphia Eagles players
BYU Cougars football players
Sports coaches from Los Angeles